Goofball may refer to 
A person exhibiting silliness
An older slang term for barbiturates
Goofball (EP), an extended play by Moody Good

See also
Goof (disambiguation)
Goofy (disambiguation)